Little Gold Creek is a border crossing located on the Top of the World Highway between Dawson City, Yukon and Chicken, Alaska, at the Alaska/Yukon border. The border post at Poker Creek–Little Gold Creek Border Crossing is shared by Canadian and American border services.

External links 
 Explore North
 Little Gold Creek Port of Entry

Settlements in Yukon